The 2014 Liga Nusantara Maluku season is the first edition of Liga Nusantara Maluku is a qualifying round of the 2014 Liga Nusantara.

The competition scheduled starts on 5 May 2014.

Teams
This season there are 10 Maluku club participants, the ten teams that include Persenam Namlea, Persmi Masohi, PSHL Hitu Leitimur, Tulehu Putra, Ambon Putra, Arrow F.C., Toisapu Laha, PS Lorihua, Persehi Hitu, dan PSA Ambon.

League table
Divided into one group of 10.

Result 
First leg play on May with 45 match and second leg play on August with 45 match.

References 

Maluku